Hold Anything is the third short in the Looney Tunes series from Warner Bros., released to theaters in October 1930.  Featuring Bosko (the star of Looney Tunes shorts of that time), it is loosely based on the lost film Hold Everything, one of whose songs, "Don't Hold Everything," features prominently in the cartoon. It was directed by Hugh Harman and Rudolf Ising, and animated by Isadore "Friz" Freleng and Norman Blackburn.

Plot summary 
The film features Bosko working on a construction site with a goat and several small mice (all of which bear a strong resemblance to Mickey Mouse; Harman and Ising had worked with Walt Disney for several years before joining Warner Bros.). After several minutes of relatively uneventful working (marked mainly by a song and dance sequence in which one of the mice is temporarily decapitated), Bosko spots his girlfriend, Honey, working in a nearby office building. After some brief flirtation, Bosko jumps down into Honey's office, pulls out a piece of sheet music, places it in Honey's typewriter, and begins playing the typewriter like a piano (Bosko types the words "Don't Hold Everything" before launching into the song). Meanwhile, back at the construction site, the goat eats a piece of a steam-powered machine and begins to float upward. Bosko reaches out the window and begins playing the goat like a calliope. The goat begins to float away, and as Bosko hangs on for his life, he accidentally grabs onto a set of udders and gets sprayed with milk, distracting him enough to lose his grip and fall onto a set of bricks. Bosko inexplicably divides into six miniature Boskos and begins playing the bricks as a xylophone before he reforms to his usual self and the cartoon irises out.

Later releases 
The scene with the marching mice was later re-used in the Warner cartoon It's Got Me Again!, albeit with minor changes to the animation. Many decades later, a clip of Hold Anything was shown in the 2003 TV documentary Animated Century, which showcased over 100 animated films from 26 countries.

References

External links 
 
 
 

1930 films
1930 animated films
Looney Tunes shorts
Warner Bros. Cartoons animated short films
American black-and-white films
Films about music and musicians
Films directed by Hugh Harman
Films directed by Rudolf Ising
Bosko films
Films scored by Frank Marsales
African-American animated films
1930s Warner Bros. animated short films